Interstate 370 (I-370) is a  Interstate Highway spur route off I-270 in Gaithersburg, Maryland, to the western end of the Maryland Route 200 (MD 200, Intercounty Connector) toll road at an interchange that provides access to the park and ride lot at the Shady Grove station on the Red Line of the Washington Metro. Despite the number, I-370 does not connect to I-70 itself. The road continues to the west of I-270 as Sam Eig Highway, a surface road. Along the way, I-370 has interchanges with MD 355 and Shady Grove Road. The freeway was completed in the late 1980s to connect I-270 to the Shady Grove station. I-370 was always part of the planned Intercounty Connector but was the only segment to be built at the time. The opening of MD 200 east of I-370 resulted in the truncation of I-370 to the interchange with MD 200 and the redesignation of the road leading into the Shady Grove station as MD 200A.

Route description

I-370 begins a short distance to the west of the I-270 interchange in Gaithersburg, Montgomery County, heading northeast as a six-lane freeway. Southwest of this interchange, the road continues as Sam Eig Highway (named after Washington real estate developer Sam Eig) which interchanges with Washingtonian Boulevard before becoming a surface road. The highway passes woods to the northwest and a shopping center to the southeast as it reaches an interchange with I-270. From this point, I-370 turns east and runs between residential neighborhoods to the north and business parks to the south, with trees separating the road from these areas. The freeway curves northeast again and comes to the MD 355 interchange. Past this, the highway passes more commercial development before reaching a bridge over CSX's Metropolitan Subdivision railroad line. A short distance later, I-370 comes to a trumpet interchange with MD 200A, a road that provides access to Shady Grove Road and the Shady Grove station of Washington Metro's Red Line. At this point, I-370 ends and the freeway continues east as MD 200 (Intercounty Connector), a toll road.

History

What is now I-370 was originally proposed as part of the Intercounty Connector in the late 1970s. The I-370 freeway opened on December 17, 1988, connecting I-270 to the Shady Grove station. Its construction cost $169 million (equivalent to $ in ), with federal funds paying for 90 percent of the cost. The state of Maryland's portion of the cost was funded with a portion of the proceeds of a  gas tax increase in 1987. Prior to its opening, driving from I-270 to the Shady Grove station involved exiting at Shady Grove Road and passing six traffic lights to arrive at the station. Upon its opening, the remainder of the Intercounty Connector was planned but not yet built. At the time, it was the third shortest Interstate, after I-878 in New York and I-395 in Baltimore.

In 2007, construction began on MD 200, which was to head east from I-370. At this time, the ramp from Shady Grove Road to westbound I-370 was shifted to a new alignment. In 2009, the lanes along I-370 were shifted to allow for construction of the MD 200 interchange. Construction on this segment of MD 200 was completed in February 2011, with the road opening to traffic on February 23. As a result of the completion of MD 200, the eastern terminus of I-370 was truncated to the west end of MD 200, with the freeway connection to the Shady Grove station becoming MD 200A.

Exit list

See also

References

External links

I-370 on Kurumi.com
Interstate Guide - I-370
I-370 at MDRoads.com
I-370 at AARoads.com
Maryland Roads - I-370

3
70-3
70-3
Roads in Montgomery County, Maryland